E Health Point are model public health units, owned and operated by HealthPoint Services India (HSI), a for-profit company launched in 2009. The units provide families in rural villages with clean drinking water, medicines, comprehensive diagnostic tools, and advanced tele-medical services that “bring” a doctor and modern, evidence-based healthcare to their community. The program was initially launched in India and has plans to expand to South America and Africa.

E Health Point provides preventive and curative healthcare services as well as access to drinking water. E Health Point Electronic Medical Records provide knowledge of the health profile of a community and also constitute a real-time disease surveillance capability, alerting local and state health administration on new disease outbreaks. Typically an E Health Point location starts out as a water service, then expands to a clinic as it becomes established. As of 2011 there were eight clinics and sixteen water points in India.

Safe drinking water 

Water treatment is provided via advanced reverse osmosis and ultra-filtration units, providing clean water for drinking and cooking on a monthly subscription basis as a preventative measure against water-borne diseases. The water units also sell contraceptives and healthcare products.

Tele-medical consultation 

Consultation with qualified doctors and trained health workers is provided via video-conferencing from HealthPoint's urban telemedical centre.

Advanced diagnostics 

Diagnostics are located at each E Health Point clinic. They provide the attending telemedical center doctor with the patient's vital signs—including a digital stethoscope, non-invasive blood pressure monitor, and electrocardiogram (ECG) - and offer more than 70 additional diagnostic tests covering all major infectious diseases and many chronic conditions, including malnutrition, heart disease, and diabetes.

Pharmaceuticals and medicines 

Each E Health Point clinic has a unit of pharmacy that dispenses primarily branded generic medicines, as well as a range of over-the-counter drugs, by a licensed pharmacist.

Referrals 

Referrals to public and private hospitals are made for patient conditions - such as childbirth, acute trauma, heart attack, cancer, and others—which are beyond the primary care treatment scope of the E HealthPoint unit; patients are provided with specific advice and a printed referral.

Collaborations 
Health Point Services works in collaboration with departments of the Government of Punjab; the Government of Andhra Pradesh. HSI also has partnership with prominent organizations in Water; HealthCare and IT such as Bhati AirTel; Fontus & Aventura Water; Piramal Water; Athenahealth USA, Sensaris USA; Dimagi at Boston; Prognosys; Procter and Gamble (P&G); and Academic & Research Institutions like CEGA – University of California; Public Health Foundation of India (PHFI) and Santa Clara California. HSI also works with the impact groups like Toniic Network; The Social Impact Network; KL Felicitas Foundation; The Eleos Foundation.

Recognitions 
 Global Winner of the Innovations for Health: Solutions that Cross Borders jointly instituted by the Ashoka Changemakers and Robert Wood Johnson Foundation
 Recognized as One of 50 Most Innovative Companies - by Technology Review, MIT 
 Winner of the GENPACT NASSCOM Social Innovation Honours 2012
 Winner of the Tech Award - Nokia Health Award 2011 awarded in the USA
 Winner of the Sankalp Award 2011for Best Emerging Enterprise in Health, Water & Sanitation Sector
 Winner of the ‘Saving Lives at Birth: Grand Challenge award’ jointly instituted by USAID, Norwegian Government, Bill & Melinda Gates Foundation, Grand Challenges Canada, and The World Bank 
 Finalist at the Piramal Healthcare Awards 2010
 Health Point Model is a case study at the Harvard Business School (HBS) 
 Global Finalist at the Ashoka Change Makers Award- Making More Health

References

External links 
 http://www.changemakers.com/morehealth/entries/e-healthpoint-transforming-rural-healthcare

Public health organisations based in India